Pinellas County Schools is the public school district serving Pinellas County, Florida. The district is based in Largo. With over 104,000 students served in more than 140 schools and centers, the district is the 7th-largest in Florida and 26th-largest in the nation. It includes the entire county.

History
The district was created upon Pinellas County's split from Hillsborough County in 1912. Dixie M. Hollins was the county's first superintendent of schools.

Like other school districts in Florida and elsewhere in the United States, Pinellas County has had to deal with issues of desegregation, court-ordered busing, and school choice. In 2000, the district received "unitary" (desegregated) status from the court assigned to monitor integration issues, and from 2003 to 2007 operated a "controlled choice" program which set minimum and maximum percentages of black pupils in individual schools.

In 2007 the "Choice" program was replaced with  a "close-to-home' school program, where students go to the school that is nearest to their residence. The Tampa Bay Times was the biggest proponent of resegregation. In multiple editorials in 2007, the Tampa Bay Times, formerly the St. Petersburg Times, urged the school district to abandon integration efforts in favor of "close to home" schools.

In addition to neighborhood schools, the district offers 70 application programs, including magnet, fundamental and career academy programs. From 2007 and by 2015 student performance and behavior at five elementary schools in a mostly black area of St. Petersburg sharply declined. Hired in 2012, Michael Grego has launched reforms to aid students in the five schools. They include adding extended learning programs, extra summer instruction and bringing in counselors and social workers to connect families with outside services. In 2014, he began pumping more money into the schools, adding classroom aides, mental health counselors and liaisons to connect families with social services 

In March 2009, Pinellas County Schools announced that all schools would close one hour early every Wednesday starting with the 2009–10 school year. The district said that this schedule change was to provide teachers with more planning period time. After much controversy, the school district voted in September 2012 to discontinue early release Wednesdays beginning with the 2013–14 school year.

Superintendents
Dixie M. Hollins (1912–1920)
Robert S. Blanton (1920–1928)
George M. Lynch (1928–1935)
George M. Hoffman (1935–1936)
Green V. Fuguitt (1936–1948)
Floyd T. Christian (1948–1965)
Paul D. Bauder (1965–1966)
James F. Gollattscheck (1966–1967)
Thomas B. Southard (1967–1971)
Nicholas G. Mangin (1971–1972)
Gus Sakkis (1972–1981)
Dr. Scott N. Rose (1981–1991)
Dr. J. Howard Hinesley (1991–2004)
Dr. Clayton M. Wilcox (2004–2008) 
Dr. Julie M. Janssen (2008–2011)
Dr. John A. Stewart (2011–2012)
Dr. Michael A. Grego (2012–2022)
Kevin Hendrick (2022-present)

School Board
The members of the school board: 
Carol J. Cook, Chairperson – Single Member District #5 (2000–present)
Peggy L. O'Shea, Vice Chairperson – At-Large District #3 (2006–present)
Janet R. Clark – At-Large District #1 (2004–present)
Terry Krassner – At-Large District #2 (2010–present)
Ken Peluso – Single Member District #4 (2014–present)
Linda S. Lerner – Single Member District #6 (1990–present)
Rene Flowers – Single Member District #7 (2012–present)

Districts 1–3 are at-large districts, elected by the voters of the entire school district. Districts 4–7 are single-member districts, voted on only by the voters who reside in the member district. The members from single-member districts are also required to reside within the district from which he or she is elected.

Schools in Pinellas County
The district covers a total of 142 institutions: 76 elementary schools, 22 middle schools, 17 high schools, 6 alternative & exception education schools, 9 adult/vocational schools, 16 centers, and 14 charter schools. With more than 17,000 teachers, administrators and support staff, the district is also Pinellas County's largest employer. Additionally, over 20,000 people serve as volunteers.

High schools

Middle schools

Elementary schools

Alternative and exceptional education schools

Career technical and adult education

Charter schools

See also

 WPDS-LD 
 List of school districts in Florida
 Pinellas Education Foundation

References

External links
 

School districts in Florida
Education in Pinellas County, Florida
.
Educational institutions established in 1912
1912 establishments in Florida